The following is a timeline of the history of the city of Yekaterinburg, Russia.

Prior to 20th century

 1723 -  built.
 1725 - Verkhne-Isetski ironworks established.
 1735 - Mint begins operating.
 1758 - St. Catherine's Cathedral founded.
 1774 - Epiphany Cathedral founded.
 1783 - Yekaterinburg coat of arms design adopted.
 1824 - Rastorguyev-Kharitonov Palace built.
 1839 - Trinity Cathedral consecrated.
 1845 - Ekaterinburg Drama Theatre founded.
 1853 - Natural history museum opens.
 1860 - Population: 19,830.
 1876 - Bolshoi Zlatoust (church belltower) built.
 1878 - Perm-Ekaterinburg railway begins operating.
 1883 - Population: 25,133.
 1885 - Russian Orthodox  established.
 1895 - Trans-Siberian Railway begins operating.
 1897 - Population: 43,052.

20th century

 1913 - Population: 70,000.
 1918 - 17 July: Execution of the Romanov family by Bolsheviks.
 1920 - Ural State University founded (including Ural Industrial Institute).
 1923 - City becomes capital of Ural Oblast.
 1924 - City renamed "Sverdlovsk."
 1926 - Population: 136,421.
 1928 - Nizhne-Isetski becomes part of city.
 1930
  established.
 Avangard football club formed.
 Bolshoi Zlatoust (church belltower) demolished.
 1932 - Uktus Airfield in operation.
 1933 - Ural Heavy Machine Building Plant begins operating.
 1934
 Urals State Conservatory founded.
 City becomes capital of the Sverdlovsk Oblast.
 1936 - Ural Philharmonic Orchestra founded.
 1939 - Population: 425,544.
 1941 - Red Army Theatre relocates temporarily to Sverdlovsk.
 1943 - Koltsovo Airport in operation.
 1955 - Television Centre begins broadcasting.
 1957 - Central Stadium built.
 1965 - Population: 919,000.
 1977 - Ipatiev House demolished.
 1979
 2 April: Sverdlovsk anthrax leak.
 Population: 1,239,000.
 1983 - TV Tower construction begins.
 1985 - Population: 1,300,000.
 1991
 City named "Yekaterinburg" again.
 Yekaterinburg Metro begins operating.
 Yekaterinburg Commodity Exchange founded.
 1992 - Arkady Mikhailovich Chernetsky becomes mayor.
 1993 - 27 September:  declared.
 1999 - Bishop  ousted.
 2000 - City becomes part of the Ural Federal District.

21st century

 2003 - Church of All Saints built.
 2006 - IKEA branch in business.
 2009
 16 June: 1st BRIC summit held in city.
 Yeltsin Presidential Center founded.
 2010
 Alexander Yacob becomes head of city administration.
  built on 
 Population: 1,349,772.
 2011
 Russian Orthodox  established.
 Vysotsky (skyscraper) built.
 2013
 15 February: Chelyabinsk meteor visible from city.
 28 August: Search for escaped crocodile.
 8 September:  held; Yevgeny Roizman wins.
 Population: 1,424,702.

See also
 Yekaterinburg history
 
 
 List of administrative-territorial units headquartered in Yekaterinburg (in Russian)

References

This article incorporates information from the Russian Wikipedia.

Bibliography

External links

Yekaterinburg
Yekaterinburg
Years in Russia